Acacia everistii is a shrub belonging to the genus Acacia and the subgenus Phyllodineae native to Queensland.

It has a scattered distribution from Brovinia in the south east to Expedition Range on the Blackdown Tableland of south eastern Queensland where it grows in sandy or loamy soils over or around sandstone as a part of open Eucalyptus woodland communities.

See also
 List of Acacia species

References

everistii
Flora of Queensland
Plants described in 1980
Taxa named by Leslie Pedley